Samuel Crowther may refer to:

 Samuel Ajayi Crowther (1809–1891), first African Anglican bishop in Nigeria
 Samuel Crowther (journalist) (1880–1947), American journalist, writer and biographer
 Sam Crowther (born 2000), Dutch footballer